Francesco Maffei (1605 – 2 July 1660) was an Italian painter, active in the Baroque style.

Biography
He probably trained in his birthplace of Vicenza with his father, and painted mostly in the towns of the Veneto (Venetian mainland). He died in Padua.

He is noted for his somewhat provincial stylistic quirks, combining the decorative manner of baroque with visual distortions and nervous brush strokes. His figures often glimmer with imprecise borders; a style which would characterize also the pittura de tocco e di macchia (painting of touch and dots) of the following decades and century. Representatives of this manner came from diverse regions of Europe, and worked in diverse styles, including Ricci, Carpioni, Magnasco, and later Francesco Guardi.

The canvases are often crowded with people and vigorous action (see War against the Fallen Angels at the Galleria Brera in Milan). He is known for paintings in Ca Rezzonico in Venice, the Palazzo del Podesta in Vicenza, and in the Church of Santa Maria del Soccorso (La Rotonda) in Rovigo (1644–55). He also painted in the Oratory of San Nicola da Tolentino in Vicenza. He was trained under the Mannerist painter, Alessandro Maganza, yet was influenced by a variety of painters, including Veronese, Jacopo Bassano, Tintoretto, and Magnasco. He is known to have traveled briefly to Venice in 1638, where he would have encountered the then brash new baroque painterly style of Liss, Strozzi, and Fetti. Maffei left Vicenza in 1657 and settled in Padua, where he died of the plague. He influenced a variety of painters, including Andrea Celesti (c1637-1711) and Antonio Bellucci (1654–1727), a mentor of Sebastiano Ricci.

The Maffei family
The surname von Maffei or Maffei is a patronymic name, derived from the Germanic personal name Matthäus. The Maffei family is of ancient German origin and, more precisely, in the 8th century A.D. derived from the Germanic tribe of the Franks. In ancient times the Maffei family settled in Verona from Germany.

Reception 

Maffei's painting of a woman holding a sword and a head in a bowl was analysed by Erwin Panofsky. He suggested that it alludes to both the story of Judith and the story of Salome. However Panofsky concludes that the painting is of a certain "type", that there is precedent in Northern Italian of including the bowl of John in depictions of Judith. From this he argues for the use of historical pictorial traditions as evidence for interpreting painting.

References

Sources

Web Gallery Art biography

Gallery

External links

1605 births
1660 deaths
17th-century Italian painters
Italian male painters
Italian Baroque painters
Painters from Venice